Dijak, Дијак is a surname. Notable people with the surname include:

Donovan Dijak (born 1987), American professional wrestler known by the ring names Dominik Dijakovic and T-Bar
Franjo Dijak (born 1977), Croatian actor
Vlado Dijak (1925–1988), Yugoslav poet and songwriter